Nelson Falcão (born 30 April 1946) is a Brazilian sailor. He received a bronze medal in the Star Class at the 1988 Summer Olympics in Seoul, South Korea with Torben Grael.

References

External links

1946 births
Living people
Brazilian male sailors (sport)
Sailors at the 1988 Summer Olympics – Star
Olympic sailors of Brazil
Olympic bronze medalists for Brazil
Olympic medalists in sailing
Star class world champions
World champions in sailing for Brazil
Medalists at the 1988 Summer Olympics
Sportspeople from Rio de Janeiro (city)